The third council of national stature, or third Council of Orléans, was a synod of the Roman Catholic Bishops of France. It opened around 7 May 538 and was presided over by Loup, Archbishop of Lyon. It established mainly:
 Sunday as day of the Lord;
 forbids field work on Sundays; 
 forbids clerics to practice usury;
 prohibition of the conjuring of priests, as a critic of their bishop (canon 24, recall of canon 18 of the Council of Chalcedon, 451). 
 The bishop must redeem a Christian slave in the service of a Jew if he takes refuge in the church, while the constitutions of the Lower Roman Empire demanded to return them to their master, without further guarantees.

A conciliabule, of which we do not know the subject, took place in Orleans in 540.

References

6th-century church councils
Christianity in Francia